Johann Jacob Roemer (8 January 1763, Zurich – 15 January 1819) was a physician and professor of botany in Zurich, Switzerland.  He was also an entomologist.

With Austrian botanist Joseph August Schultes, he published the 16th edition of Carl Linnaeus' Systema Vegetabilium.

Roemer's Genera insectorum is a most attractive Swiss publication on entomology. The splendid hand-coloured plates were drawn and engraved by the Swiss artist J.R. Schellenberg, an entomologist himself and therefore familiar with structural details.

In 1793, he was elected a foreign member of the Royal Swedish Academy of Sciences. The botanical genus Roemeria from the family Papaveraceae is named after him.

Works

Magazin für die Botanik, vols. 1–4; 1787–1791, with publicist Paul Usteri (1768-1831). Afterwards Roemer continued this series as Neues Magazin für die Botanik.
Genera insectorum Linnaei et Fabricii iconibus illustrata. Vitoduri Helvetorum (Winterthur), apud Henric. Steiner, 1789
Flora Europaea... Norimbergae [Nürnberg] 14 fasc. 1797-1811
Collecteana ad Omnem rem Botanicam Spectantia Partim e Propriis, Partim ex Amicorum Schedis Manuscriptis Concinnavit et Edidit J. J. Roemer, M.D. Turici [Zurich], In parts between 1806 and 1810.
Systema vegetabilium (ed. 16) 7 vols. - 1817-1830

References

1763 births
1819 deaths
19th-century Swiss botanists
Swiss entomologists
19th-century Swiss physicians
18th-century Swiss physicians
Members of the Royal Swedish Academy of Sciences
Physicians from Zürich
18th-century Swiss botanists